Ensayo final is a 1955 Argentine film. Alberto Closas played the main role. It was directed by Mario C. Lugones.

Cast

External links
 

1955 films
1950s Spanish-language films
Argentine black-and-white films
Argentine drama films
1955 drama films
1950s Argentine films